Yazmín Colón de Cortizo (born Yazmín Colón Gerena) is a businesswoman from Puerto Rico, the United States, who became the First Lady of Panama on July 1, 2019, when her husband President Laurentino Cortizo took office. She studied at The George Washington University, obtaining a degree in Literature in 1981.

References 

|-

Living people
First ladies and gentlemen of Panama
George Washington University alumni
Panamanian people of Puerto Rican descent
People from San Juan, Puerto Rico
1959 births